Khueang Nai is a district (amphoe) in the northwestern part of Ubon Ratchathani province, northeastern Thailand.

Geography
Neighboring districts are (from the east clockwise) Muang Sam Sip, Mueang Ubon Ratchathani of Ubon Ratchathani Province, Kanthararom, Yang Chum Noi of Sisaket province, Kho Wang, Maha Chana Chai, Kham Khuean Kaeo of Yasothon province and Hua Taphan of Amnat Charoen province.

History
Originally named Pachin Ubon (ปจิมอุบล, 'western Ubon'), in 1913 the district was renamed Trakan Phuet Phon (ตระการพืชผล). In 1917, the district was renamed Khueang Nai.

Administration
The district is divided into 18 sub-districts (tambons), which are further subdivided into 180 villages (mubans). Khueang Nai is a sub-district municipality (thesaban tambon) which covers parts of tambon Khueang Nai. There are a further 18 tambon administrative organizations (TAO).

References

External links
amphoe.com (Thai)

Khueang Nai